Jugoton was the largest record label and chain record store in the former Yugoslavia based in Zagreb, SR Croatia.

History
Jugoton was formed in 1947. It is notable for releasing some of the most important former Yugoslav pop and rock records. In addition, the company owned a widespread network of record shops across SFR Yugoslavia.

The company changed its name to Croatia Records in 1991, after Croatia seceded from Yugoslavia.

Artists 
Jugoton notable for signing numerous eminent former Yugoslav pop and rock acts. Some of the artists that have been signed to Jugoton include:

Aerodrom
Ansambel bratov Avsenik
Silvana Armenulić
Atomi
Azra
Đorđe Balašević
Bele Vrane
Beograd
Halid Bešlić
Bezobrazno Zeleno
Bijele Strijele
Bijelo Dugme
Biseri
Borghesia
Bulevar
Cacadou Look
Crni Biseri
Crvena Jabuka
Crveni Koralji
Zdravko Čolić
Dah
Daltoni
Dʼ Boys
Delfini (Split band)
Delfini (Zagreb band)
Denis & Denis
Devil Doll
Divlje Jagode
Dorian Gray
Dubrovački trubaduri
Du Du A
Dino Dvornik
Električni Orgazam
Faraoni
Film
Garavi Sokak
Griva
Grupa Marina Škrgatića
Grupa 220
Hari Mata Hari
Haustor
Hobo
Idoli
Indexi
Ibrica Jusić
Tereza Kesovija
Kontraritam
Korni Grupa
Laboratorija Zvuka
Laki Pingvini
Leb i Sol
Josipa Lisac
Oliver Mandić
Đorđe Marjanović
Srđan Marjanović
Seid Memić
Slađana Milošević
Zana Nimani
Oko
Opus
Osmi Putnik
Parni Valjak
Partibrejkers
Pekinška Patka
Petar i Zli Vuci
Plavi Orkestar
Prljavo Kazalište
Profili Profili
Rani Mraz
Riblja Čorba
Rokeri s Moravu
Sanjalice
September
Slomljena Stakla
Ivica Šerfezi
Srebrna Krila
S Vremena Na Vreme
Šarlo Akrobata
Tajči
Time
Neda Ukraden
U Škripcu
YU Grupa
Zabranjeno Pušenje
Zana
Zlatni Dečaci
Zlatni Prsti
Žeteoci

Jugoton also released the influential compilation album Paket aranžman. Many artists that represented Yugoslavia in the Eurovision Song Contest were signed with Jugoton, including the 1989 winners Riva.

Like other former Yugoslav labels, Jugoton also had a licence to release foreign titles for the Yugoslav market including notable international popular music stars such as:  Rick Astley, The Beatles, David Bowie, Kate Bush, Deep Purple, Eurythmics, Iron Maiden, Kraftwerk, John Lennon, Madonna, Gary Moore, Mötley Crüe, Elvis Presley, Pink Floyd, Public Image Limited, Queen, The Rolling Stones, Scorpions, U2, Whitesnake, Kim Wilde and others.

Competition
Other major labels in the former Socialist Federal Republic of Yugoslavia were: PGP-RTB and Jugodisk from Belgrade, Suzy from Zagreb, Diskoton from Sarajevo, ZKP RTLJ from Ljubljana, Diskos from Aleksandrovac, and others.

Legacy

Yugonostalgia

Jugoton, as an important part of the former Yugoslav culture is one of the subjects of Yugonostalgia.

The former Jugoton record shop located in the main shopping mall in Skopje (Gradski Trgovski Centar), North Macedonia, still operates under the same name managed by the Macedonian record label Lithium Records.

An example of different kind is the online radio and web tv station called Jugoton which operates in the Yugoslav diaspora in Vienna, Austria. It plays music from the former Yugoslavia, but also from all the contemporary former Yugoslav countries, including pop, rock and folk. However, it is not formally related to the actual Jugoton, and not all the Yugoslav artists represented in its program were really signed to the label.

Yugoton

Yugoton is a Polish tribute album to the former Yugoslav rock scene released in 2001. Its title is a nod to Jugoton.

See also
List of record labels

References

External links
Croatia Records official website

Croatian record labels
Yugoslav record labels
Croatian music history
Yugoslav rock music
Record labels established in 1947
Record labels disestablished in 1990
1947 establishments in Yugoslavia
Companies based in Zagreb
State-owned record labels